Katarzyna Mary "Kasia" Lipka (born 26 May 1993) is a retired English footballer who played as a midfielder for Sheffield United in the FA Women's Championship.

Career
After spending a decade of her youth career at Sheffield United, Lipka spent eight years with Doncaster Rovers Belles and signed her first professional contract with the club in December 2015.

Lipka went on to sign with FA Women's Super League team Sunderland in September 2017.

Following a season out with injury, Lipka returned to Sheffield United ahead of the 2019–20 season.

International
Lipka was part of the gold medal-winning Team GB at the 2013 Summer Universiade held in Kazan, Russia.

References

External links
 Kasia Lipka profile at the official Football Association website
 Doncaster Rovers Belles player profile 
 

Living people
English women's footballers
Women's association football midfielders
England women's under-23 international footballers
1993 births
Women's Super League players
Doncaster Rovers Belles L.F.C. players
Sunderland A.F.C. Ladies players
Footballers from Sheffield
FA Women's National League players
Alumni of the University of Leeds
Sheffield United W.F.C. players
Universiade gold medalists for Great Britain
Universiade medalists in football
Medalists at the 2013 Summer Universiade
Women's Championship (England) players
England women's youth international footballers